Montes Teneriffe is a range on the northern part of the Moon's near side. It was named after Tenerife, one of the Canary Islands.

This range is located in the northern part of the Mare Imbrium, to the southwest of the crater Plato. The Montes Teneriffe lie within a diameter of 112 kilometers, although the peaks only occupy a small part of that region. The formation consists of a few scattered ridges surrounded by the lunar mare. Individual peaks rise to heights of up to 2.4 km.

To the southeast of the range is the solitary Mons Pico.

References

Teneriffe, Montes